Kazbek Alievich Tuaev (Kazbek Alirza oglu Tuayev, ; born 13 November 1940 in Alyat, Azerbaijan SSR, USSR) is an Azerbaijani footballer and manager.

Career
Tuaev played for Neftchi Baku as a forward from 1961 to 1972 and managed the side in the 1970s, 1980s, and 2000s. He also played for and managed Spartak Orjonikidze in the 1970s. Tuaev made his debut for USSR on 1 October 1967 in a friendly against Switzerland.

Tuaev has also managed the Azerbaijani national football team. He was classified as a Master of Sport of the USSR in 1963.

External links

Kazbek Tuaev on RussiaTeam.ru 

1940 births
Soviet footballers
Soviet football managers
Soviet expatriate football managers
Azerbaijani footballers
Soviet Union international footballers
Soviet Top League players
Neftçi PFK managers
FC Spartak Vladikavkaz players
Living people
Azerbaijani football managers
Azerbaijan national football team managers
Azerbaijani expatriate football managers
FC Spartak Vladikavkaz managers
Expatriate football managers in Tunisia
Club Africain football managers
Footballers from Baku
Soviet Azerbaijani people
Association football forwards
Neftçi PFK players
Honoured Masters of Sport of the USSR
Expatriate football managers in Russia